James Henry Moody (12 March 1896 – 21 February 1968) was an English professional footballer who played as a goalkeeper for Grimsby Town and Rochdale.
His playing career came to an abrupt end in January 1928 after he suffered a head injury whilst playing for Rochdale against Stockport County.

References

1896 births
1968 deaths
Footballers from Rochdale
English footballers
Association football goalkeepers
Rochdale A.F.C. players
Mid Rhondda F.C. players
Grimsby Town F.C. players
English Football League players